Lippe (later Lippe-Detmold and then again Lippe) was a historical state in Germany, ruled by the House of Lippe. It was located between the Weser river and the southeast part of the Teutoburg Forest.
 

History
The founder of what would become the County of Lippe (1528–1789), then the Principality of Lippe (1789–1918) was Bernhard I, who received a grant of territory from Lothair III in 1123. Bernhard I assumed the title of Edler Herr zu Lippe ("Noble Lord at Lippe"). The history of the dynasty and its further acquisitions of land really began with Bernard II. His territory was probably formed out of land he acquired on the destruction of the Duchy of Saxony following the demise of Henry the Lion in 1180. Simon V was the first ruler of Lippe to style himself as a count (Graf) in 1528.

Following the death of Simon VI in 1613, the county was partitioned between his three sons; Lippe-Detmold went to Simon VII, Lippe-Brake to Otto and Lippe-Alverdissen went to Philip I. The county of Lippe-Brake was reunited with the main Detmold line in 1709. A son of Simon VII, Jobst Herman, founded another branch of the family, the Lippe-Biesterfeld line; the Lippe-Weissenfeld branch later separated from the Lippe-Biesterfelds. Both Lippe-Biesterfeld and Lippe-Weissenfeld were paragiums (non-sovereign estates of a cadet-branch) within the County of Lippe, and both branches, owning only modest manor houses in the county, acquired property in other states by marriage and moved out of the county in the late 18th century, the Biesterfeld branch to the Rhineland and the Weissenfeld branch to Saxony. 

Leopold I (1767-1802) became the first Prince of Lippe in 1789. Lippe joined the North German Confederation in 1866 and the German Empire in 1871. On 20 July 1895, Prince Woldemar died childless. The title nominally passed to his brother Alexander who was incapable of governing due to mental illness. The regency initially passed to Adolf of Schaumburg-Lippe, in accordance with Woldemar's will.

Since the counts of Lippe-Biesterfled and Lippe-Weissenfeld also laid claim to the regency and the right to succeed Alexander, a succession dispute arose, which continued until 1905. The Schaumburg-Lippe claim was actively supported by Emperor Wilhelm II (whose sister was married to Prince Adolf). A ruling in the Reichsgericht in Leipzig in 1897 decided the matter in favour of Count Ernest of Lippe-Biesterfeld, who then assumed the regency. However, at the instruction of Wilhelm II, the military forces stationed in Lippe refused to address him as "illustrious" and denied the other honours that he was entitled to. In response, Ernest sent a letter round to the other sovereign princes of the German Empire in which he complained about the Emperor's behaviour - an unprecedented action, which brought German public opinion strongly in favour of Ernest's position.

After Ernest's death in 1904, his son Leopold assumed the regency. When Prince Alexander died the following year, the Reichsgericht finally recognised the right of House Lippe-Biesterfeld to the succession and Leopold took the throne as Prince Leopold IV.

The Principality of Lippe came to an end on 12 November 1918 with the abdication of Leopold IV. Lippe becoming a Free State. In 1947, Lippe merged into the state of North Rhine-Westphalia.

Government 
An 1819/20 attempt to establish a constitution failed and the first basic law was passed in 1836. It was liberalised in 1849, restored in 1853 and then steadily modernised in 1853, 1876, and 1912. The 1876 electoral law abolished an estates-based system and introduced the three-class franchise, which did not offer a general, equal, or democratic possibility of participation to the citizens. Lippe increasingly developed into a constitutional monarchy. The highest national authority was the cabinet, headed by the State Minister, which oversaw the top-level administrative and legal authorities. In 1868, the property of the princes and the property of the state were separated. The Princes retained a large personal estate, including palaces, land, forests, long-term leases, Bad Meinberg, and the salt deposits at Uflen, which mostly came under state control after the abdication of Leopold IV in 1918. 

As a state of the German empire, Lippe was represented on the Bundesrat (Federal Council). Lippe had a single representative, who was selected by the landed nobility. The Bundesrat was dominated by Prussia, which had 17 representatives, out of a total of 58, meaning that Lippe was practically irrelevant in the council. It was one of sixteen states with only one representative on the council.

Law
When the Wolfenbüttel court was abolished, an "interim upper appellate court" was established, which had oversight of the courts in Lippe. After the Prussian annexation of Hannover in 1866, this was subordinated to the Prussian appellate system, but then became an Oberlandsgericht once more in 1879. Its role as Lippe's Oberlandsgericht was regulated by a treaty of 4 January 1879. The exclaves of Lipperode and Cappel came under the Prussian district court in Lippstadt. Lippe belonged to Celle until 1944.

Administrative subdivisions

In 1879, the Principality was divided into five administrative subdivisions, called Ämter (singular ): Blomberg, Detmold,  and Lipperode-Cappel. The cities of Barntrup, Blomberg, Detmold, Horn, Lage, Lemgo and Salzuflen, as well as the village of Schwalenberg were outside of the Amt-system (Schwalenberg received the status of city in 1906).

In 1910, the system was reformed. Lippe was divided into five Verwaltungsämter, containing thirteen Ämtern. 
 Verwaltungsamt Blomberg (Ämter Blomberg, Schieder and Schwalenberg) with 45 districts and an area of 199.36 km²
 Verwaltungsamt Brake (Ämter Brake, Hohenhausen, Sternberg-Barntrup and Varenholz) with 64 districts and an area of 364.60 km²
 Verwaltungsamt Detmold (Ämter Detmold, Horn and Lage) with 64 districts and an area of 375.05 km²
 Verwaltungsamt Lipperode-Cappel (Amt Lipperode-Cappel) with 3 districts and an area of 7.66 km²
 Verwaltungsamt Schötmar (Ämter Oerlinghausen and Schötmar) with 34 districts and an area of 158.06 km²
The eight cities remained outside the Amt-system.

Economy

On the whole, Lippe was always an agrarian state and, in economic terms, was one of the weakest states in the German Empire. The loess floodplains of the Werre and the Bega always enabled intensive agriculture. In the less fertile sandy soils of the Senne region, on the other hand, intensive agriculture was not possible.

Industry existed only on a limited scale and was mostly based on the direct extraction of the land's mineral and forest resources. This was partially a consequence of the power of the landed nobility and the unfriendly attitude of the monarchs towards economic undertakings at the beginning of the Industrial Revolution. The monarchy's economic interventions focussed mainly on securing their own economic power, which rested more on the direct income from the princes' own estates, forests, salt mines and health baths, than on taxes on independent production and trade. 

The textile industry supported flax farming and linen production. The largest industrial concern was probably Hoffmann's Stärkefabriken. The Principality also had a significant sepiolite industry in Lemgo, salt evaporation ponds in Salzuflen (1878: 1,240,000 kg of salt) and a timber industry, which still exists today, with numerous sawmills processing material from Lippe's forests. As in neighbouring Prussia, the cigar industry also gained particular significance. Like the textile industry, it was partially organised in a proto-industrial fashion, through the putting-out system. There were also beer breweries (e.g.  and ), brickworks, a sugar factory in Lage, and oil mills. The spa towns of Bad Meinberg und Bad Salzuflen also gained economic significance.

Military

A Lippe battalion was formed on 5 May 1807, the 2nd battalion of the 5th infantry regiment of the Prince's Division of the Confederation of the Rhine. It also included a company from Schaumburg-Lippe. Following the integration of Lippe into the Prussian Army, the Prince's Division was dissolved on 27 May 1867. The regiment's headquarters and its 3rd battalion were based in Detmold by 1918. 

A white-blue-red uniform based on that of France was introduced for the Lippe soldiers in 1815. This uniform was also depicted on the Notgeld issued by the city of Detmold in the 1920s and bottles of Lipper Schütze schnapps were modelled on it, ensuring that it remained part of the popular imagination. By 1867, at the latest, Lippe soldiers had switched to using the Prussian uniform and could only be distinguished from other troops by the Lippe cockade in the national colours (yellow-red-yellow).

In reality, Lippe no longer had a military of its own after 1867 and even before that was in no position to maintain an independent force the size of a regiment. The song  ("Lippe-Detmold, a wonderful city") presents a caricature of this military weakness and became a kind of national song for Lippe. In the song, a Lippe soldier goes to war and is shot dead, forcing his general to abandon the campaign, because he had been the Lippe army's only soldier. The Lippe Notgeld of the 1920s was inspired by the song. Despite this, Lippe retained a certain military significance as the site of the Sennelager Training Area

List of Princes of Lippe

List of State Ministers

See also
 List of consorts of Lippe
 Ostwestfalen-Lippe

Notes

References

Attribution

Further reading
A. Falkmann, Beiträge zur Geschichte des Fürstenthums Lippe (Detmold, 1857–1892; 6 vols.)
Schwanold, Das Fürstentum Lippe, das Land und seine Bewohner (Detmold, 1899)
Piderit, Die lippischen Edelherrn im Mittelalter (Detmold, 1876)
A. Falkmann and O. Preuss, Lippische Regenten (Detmold, 1860–1868)
H. Triepel, Der Streit um die Thronfolge im Fürstentum Lippe (Leipzig, 1903)
P. Laband, Die Thronfolge im Fürstentum Lippe (Freiburg, 1891)
Schiedsspruch in dem Rechtstreit über die Thronfolge im Fürstentum Lippe vom 25 Okt. 1905 (Leipzig, 1906)

External links

Ordinances and by-laws of the county of Lippe online 
Guidelines for the integration of the Land Lippe within the territory of the federal state North-Rhine-Westphalia of 17 January 1947 

 
States and territories disestablished in 1918
States and territories established in 1123
States of the Confederation of the Rhine
States of the German Empire
Lower Rhenish-Westphalian Circle
Lists of princes
Former principalities
Principalities of the Holy Roman Empire
1120s establishments in the Holy Roman Empire
1123 establishments in Europe
1918 disestablishments in Germany
Former states and territories of North Rhine-Westphalia
States of the North German Confederation